Bozo Ratliff was a rockabilly singer from 1950s. Bozo Ratliff recorded for Space Records , which was distributed out of St. Louis, Missouri.  His single for Space Records, "Rock Along Time"/"Let Me In" (Space No. 100), was released in 1957.  The writer for both of these songs was John Roller.

Discography

Single
 "Rock Along Time"/"Let Me In" (Space No. 100) (1957)

Various artists compilations
 Live It Up (Buffalo Bop CD 55155)
 Ultra Rare Rockabilly's, Vol. 6 (Chief CD 1156506)
 Ultra Rare Rockabilly's, Vol. 9 (Chief CD 1156509)
 Grab This And Dance, Vol. 20 (Club LP 020)
 Pure Rockabilly, Vol. 5 (Club PR LP 005)
 Rock-A-Billy Boppin' (White Label LP 8842)

See also
Garage Rock

External links
  Rockin' Country Style
 Rare Rockabilly
 Interviews of Bozo Ratliff

American rockabilly musicians
Year of birth missing
Year of death missing